Paweł Aleksander Król (born 10 October 1960) is a Polish former footballer who played as a defender and made 22 appearances for the Poland national team.

Career
Król made his debut for Poland on 27 January 1981 in a friendly match against Japan, which finished as a 4–2 win. He went on to make 22 appearances, scoring 3 goals, before making their last appearance on 24 August 1988 in the 3–2 friendly win against Bulgaria.

Career statistics

International

International goals

References

External links
 
 
 
 Profile at kicker.de

1960 births
Living people
People from Strzelce County
Sportspeople from Opole Voivodeship
Polish footballers
Poland international footballers
Polish expatriate footballers
Polish expatriate sportspeople in Germany
Expatriate footballers in Germany
Polish expatriate sportspeople in Sweden
Expatriate footballers in Sweden
Association football defenders
Odra Opole players
Śląsk Wrocław players
SC Fortuna Köln players
Helsingborgs IF players
Jönköpings Södra IF players
Ekstraklasa players
2. Bundesliga players